Guglielmo Segato (23 March 1906 – 19 April 1979) was an Italian cyclist who competed in the 1932 Summer Olympics. He won a gold medal in the team road race and a silver in the individual event.

References

1906 births
1979 deaths
Italian male cyclists
Olympic cyclists of Italy
Cyclists at the 1932 Summer Olympics
Olympic gold medalists for Italy
Olympic silver medalists for Italy
Olympic medalists in cycling
People from the Province of Padua
Medalists at the 1932 Summer Olympics
Cyclists from the Province of Padua